Golden Eighties (also known as Window Shopping) is a 1986 musical comedy film co-written and directed by Chantal Akerman. The film explores themes such as consumerism, feminism, and Jewish identity through the lens of a shopping mall.

Plot
The film follows the romantic lives of an ensemble of retail employees at a shopping mall.
Sylvie, a coffee shop employee, pines for her boyfriend who has traveled to Labrador seeking fortune. Her customer Eli, an American man, reencounters Jeanne, a Jewish woman from Poland who had been his lover in the wake of World War II when he was stationed in France. He pursues her in an attempt to start a new life with her, but ultimately, Jeanne cannot bring herself to leave the life she built with her shopkeeper husband and her son Robert.

Meanwhile, Pascale, a hairdresser, pines for Robert despite his love for the salon’s manager Lili. Robert is rejected by Lili for Monsieur Jean, the wealthy married man who owns the salon. Robert instead resolves to marry hairdresser Mado, but is caught in a final tryst with Lili by Pascale. Word of Robert’s infidelity spreads to everybody but Mado. When the news reaches Monsieur Schwartz, he tries to leverage it to make Monsieur Jean sell Lili’s salon to him so he can expand his shop. Enraged, Monsieur Jean violently confronts Lili in the salon. Eli and Lili leave the mall together.

Months after these events, Robert now runs a boutique in the space formerly occupied by the salon and is set to marry Mado. On the eve of the wedding, Lili returns to the mall to proclaim her love for Robert. Mado catches the pair kissing in a fitting room and is distraught, running to Jeanne for comfort. Jeanne consoles Mado by telling her that she and Robert would not have been happy together and invites her to dinner with herself and her husband. As they leave the mall, they run into Eli and his new girlfriend.

Cast
 Delphine Seyrig as Jeanne Schwartz
 Myriam Boyer as Sylvie
 Fanny Cottençon as Lili
 Lio as Mado
 Pascale Salkin as Pascale
 Charles Denner as Monsieur Schwartz
 Jean-François Balmer as Monsieur Jean
 John Berry as Eli
 Nicolas Tronc as Robert Schwartz

Production
Akerman had conceived Golden Eighties in the style of a Technicolor MGM musical. In part because this was such a departure from her earlier work, Akerman was unable to secure funding for the project. In 1983, the director released a documentary showcasing the movie’s early phases of production to attract investors. The first hour of the documentary feature, titled Les Annees 80s, featured scenes from rehearsals. The documentary continued with an abbreviated version of the musical followed by Akerman thanking her collaborators over 365-degree footage of Brussels. The director concluded the documentary with the phrase "Next year in Jerusalem".

Although Les Annees 80s was poorly received at the 1983 New York Film Festival, Akerman eventually secured the funding she needed. Filming for the funded feature took place in Brussels over the course of eight weeks in 1985. Budget constraints resulted in a more modest production than Akerman had envisioned; for example, the choreography was simpler than she had hoped.

Release
Golden Eighties premiered at the 1986 Directors' Fortnight, a parallel section of the Cannes Film Festival. The film received a limited release in the United States on 17 April 1992 under the title Window Shopping to avoid confusion with Les Annees 80s, the musical’s making-of documentary which was released as Golden Eighties in the United States.

Reception
Golden Eighties enjoyed modest success in Belgium and France upon its original release. In a 1992 review for The New York Times, critic Vincent Canby described the film as an "unpretentious, absolutely charming romantic comedy-with-music, the small scale of which perfectly suits the passions of its characters".

References

External links
 
 

1986 films
1986 comedy films
1980s French films
1980s French-language films
1980s musical comedy films
Belgian comedy films
Belgian musical films
Films directed by Chantal Akerman
Films set in shopping malls
French musical comedy films
French-language Belgian films
French-language Swiss films
Swiss musical comedy films
Workplace comedy films